Culnady (named after the townland of Culnady) is a small village near Maghera in County Londonderry, Northern Ireland. In the 2001 Census it had a population of 144 people. It is situated within Mid-Ulster District.

History 
Dunglady fort is a Ringfort located less than a mile from the village of Culnady variously dated from around 100 AD, to as early as 2000 BC.It is 110m in diameter with three banks and three ditches (up to 5m. deep) with a straight entrance. A legendary home of the Celtic Kings, it is the earliest known instance of residence in the Culnady area. The fort was occupied by tribes during the earliest periods of Irish history, until the arrival of the plantations (c.17th century) in Ireland, at which time settlers began to live in the low-lying areas surrounding the Clady river, using it for farming, and thus the village of Culnady was born.

Rivers 

The Grillagh River which is an artery of the Clady River along with the Knockoneil River flows through the town underneath the Old Culnady Bridge where a large weir has been constructed to dam the Grillagh for hydro energy for the Culnady mill which is nothing more than rubble these days. The Grillagh River along with the larger Artery River The Knockoneil River which can be seen just half a mile outside the village at the Old Dunglady Bridge. The Grillagh and Knockoneil merge in the vast floodplain around a quarter mile from Dunglady Bridge for the Knockoneil and Curdian Bridge for the Grillagh to form the Clady River.This spot is known locally and by the Clady Angling Club as the Joinings. Here the Clady flows on towards Eden Drumnacannon Bridge and then from here the river flows onwards through Greenlough then through Clady and flows out into the Lower Bann above Portglenone

Demography 
Culnady lies within
 Upperlands census ward
 Magherafelt Local Government District
 Mid Ulster Parliamentary Constituency
 Northern Health and Social Care Trust
 North Eastern Education and Library Board.

In the 2005 Urban Rural Classification, it was classified as a rural ward.
In the 2001 Census it had a population of 144 people.

Notable landmarks 

 Culnady Presbyterian Church - The earliest records of the church date from 1801, but it is believed to have been in existence long before this. The church is part of the Presbyterian Church in Ireland, and is paired with the presbyterian Church in Swatragh. As of 2010, the Church has roughly 120 attending families.
 Culnady Primary School - The school dates from the late 1800s and closed in summer 2019.
 Culnady Orange Hall - The lodge dates back to 1870, and in 1906 an agreement was drawn up between the members of the lodge and Daniel McAlery, who owned the ground where the present lodge now stands. The lodge is part of the Orange Order and is one of the largest lodges in the surrounding district.
 The village store – Originally established in 1956 by John A. McGuiness, now permanently closed.

See also 
List of villages in Northern Ireland
List of towns in Northern Ireland

References 
Belfast : H.M.S.O., 1940.
NI Neighbourhood Information System

Villages in County Londonderry
Mid-Ulster District